Senad Sallaku (born 8 October  1995 in Tirana) is an Albanian footballer who currently plays as a centre-midfield for KF Tirana in the Albanian Superliga.

Club career
Sallaku was promoted to the senior team at KF Tirana by coach Shkëlqim Muça during the 2015–16 season where he made his professional debut in the friendly against KS Bylis. He signed a four–year contract with KF Tirana on 25 July 2015, keeping him at the club until 2018.

References

External links
Senad Sallaku at FC Wels' website
 Profile - FSHF

1995 births
Living people
Footballers from Tirana
Albanian footballers
Association football midfielders
Albania youth international footballers
Besa Kavajë players
KF Tirana players
FK Dinamo Tirana players
Kategoria Superiore players
Kategoria e Parë players
Austrian Regionalliga players
Albanian expatriate footballers
Albanian expatriate sportspeople in Germany
Expatriate footballers in Germany
Albanian expatriate sportspeople in Austria
Expatriate footballers in Austria